Microgaza vetula is a species of sea snail, a marine gastropod mollusk in the family Solariellidae.

Description
The size of the shell attains 7 mm.

Distribution
This species occurs in the Atlantic Ocean off the Bahamas at depths between 119 m and 192 m.

References

 Woodring, W. P. 1928. Miocene Mollusks from Bowden, Jamaica. Part II. Gastropods and discussion of results. Carnegie Institute of Washington Publication 385: vii + 564 pp., 40 pls.

External links
 To Biodiversity Heritage Library (1 publication)
 To Encyclopedia of Life
 To World Register of Marine Species

vetula
Gastropods described in 1928